Udayan  Mukherjee is Indian television journalist and economist  who was formerly the managing editor with CNBC India. He is 48 years old and moved to Kumaon in 2013. He lives in Seetla, Uttarakhand.

Udayan is an economist by training having obtained his B.Sc in Economics from Presidency College, Kolkata and an MA in Economics from Jawaharlal Nehru University, New Delhi. He began his career with UTV. At CNBC India he was the Managing Editor and anchored live market shows until he stepped down in 2013 citing professional fatigue. In 2018, he wrote a fiction novel titled Dark Circles. Mental health was a key issue he wanted to address in the book. He also shared his own journey from the newsroom to the writing desk, and why he never plans to return to television studios again. Subsequently he turned entrepreneur and set up 2 resorts in Munsiyari (Uttarakhand) and Ladakh. However in June 2021 Mukherjee made a comeback with India today group joining their business channel Business Today.

Awards
 2012, Ramnath Goenka Awards, Journalist of the Year in the broadcasting category.

Books 
Mukherjee has authored three books during his time off the studios. Death in the Himalayas is a fiction book in the mystery genre. Dark Circles is a fiction novel about mental health issues. Essential Items: Stories from a Land in Lockdown is a collection of short stories which he wrote during the COVID 19 pandemic.

References

External links
 Udayan profile at MoneyControl Online

CNBC-TV18
Indian television news anchors
Living people
21st-century Indian novelists
Indian male novelists
English-language writers from India
Year of birth missing (living people)